HD 156411 b (also known as HIP 84787 b) is an extrasolar planet which orbits the G-type main sequence star HD 156411, located approximately 179 light years away in the constellation Ara. This planet has at least three-fourths the mass of Jupiter and takes eight-thirds years to orbit the star at a semimajor axis of 1.81 AU. However unlike most other known exoplanets, its eccentricity is not known, but it is typical that its inclination is not known. This planet was detected by HARPS on October 19, 2009, together with 29 other planets.

The planet HD 156411 b is named Sumajmajta. The name was selected in the NameExoWorlds campaign by Peru, during the 100th anniversary of the IAU. Sumaj Majta was one half of the couple involved in a tragic love story Way to the Sun by Abraham Valdelomar.

References 

Exoplanets discovered in 2009
Exoplanets detected by radial velocity
Giant planets
Ara (constellation)
Exoplanets with proper names